The Fighting Coward can refer to:

 The Fighting Coward (1924 film), a 1924 silent film
 The Fighting Coward (1935 film), a 1935 film